Tell No Tales is a 1939 American crime film directed by Leslie Fenton, written by Lionel Houser, and starring Melvyn Douglas, Louise Platt, Gene Lockhart and Douglass Dumbrille. Fenton's feature-film directorial debut, it was released on May 12, 1939, by Metro-Goldwyn-Mayer.

Plot
Michael Cassidy runs The Evening Guardian newspaper. However, publisher Matt Cooper sends Cassidy a telegram on its 75th birthday, informing him that he is shutting it down that very night. Cooper also owns The Record, a more lurid, scandal-filled paper, and he bought The Guardian solely to get rid of the competition.  Cooper offers him any job he wants on The Record, but Cassidy turns him down. He abhors The Record, citing its shameful treatment of schoolteacher Ellen Frazier, a witness in a current kidnapping case.

When Cassidy pays his bar tab, the bartender notices his $100 bill is part of the kidnapping ransom money, the first bill to surface and the first clue in the case. Cassidy got the bill when the bartender cashed his check the night before. The bartender recalls getting it from jewelry store proprietor Charlie Daggett. Cassidy goes to Cooper and begs him to keep publishing The Guardian, offering him a story that will sell many newspapers for weeks. Cooper insists he print it in The Record or else he will turn him over to the police for withholding information. Cassidy flees.

Cassidy decides to track down the kidnappers. He sneaks in past a protective police cordon to see Ellen Frazier and, posing as a lawyer, persuades her to leave with him and identify the crooks if she can. She does not recognize Daggett, but he tells Cassidy who gave him the $100: a Mrs. Lovelake. Mrs. Lovelake's husband, a doctor, recalls receiving the bill from a patient with a knife wound, a black boxer named James Alley.

Ellen leaves while Cassidy is questioning Daggett, but later returns after he sees the Lovelakes. He convinces her to go to Davie Bryant at the newspaper, where she will hopefully be safe, but she is abducted at gunpoint on the street. Meanwhile, Cassidy goes to see Alley, but finds himself at his wake. It turns out he was run over by a car. His widow Ruby reluctantly admits she got the money from a friend of singer Lorna Travers, but does not know his name. Posing as a treasury agent, Cassidy gets the name from Travers, none other than Cooper. Cooper got the $100 as part of his winnings at Arno's gambling house. Arno is an old friend of Cassidy's; he points the reporter to two gangsters as the likely source of the bill. However, this information makes him realize his brother Phil must be mixed up in the kidnapping, so Arno reluctantly tips off the crooks that Cassidy is coming. Cassidy is easily captured. Phil Arno, who had laundered money for the criminals, gets a guilty conscience and helps Cassidy and Ellen escape death at the cost of his own life. Cassidy breaks the story for his paper. Cooper then decides not to close The Guardian after all.

Cast 

 Melvyn Douglas as Michael Cassidy
 Louise Platt as Ellen Frazier
 Gene Lockhart as Arno
 Douglass Dumbrille as Matt Cooper 
 Florence George as Lorna Travers
 Halliwell Hobbes as Doctor Lovelake
 Zeffie Tilbury as Miss Mary
 Harlan Briggs as Davie Bryant
 Sara Haden as Miss Brendon
 Hobart Cavanaugh as Charlie Daggett 
 Oscar O'Shea as Sam O'Neil
 Theresa Harris as Ruby
 Jean Fenwick as Mrs. Lovelake
 Esther Dale as Mrs. Haskins
 Joseph Crehan as Chalmers
 Tom Collins as Phil Arno
 Clayton Moore as Wilson (uncredited)

Reception 
Frank Nugent praised Fenton in The New York Times, writing, "A director who can take such a thin and unimaginative story ... and still cause it to walk along a knife-edge of suspense and melodramatic excitement, is doing a big favor for everybody concerned, notably, of course, for the author."

References

External links 
 
 
 
 

1939 films
1939 crime films
American black-and-white films
American crime films
Films about journalists
Films directed by Leslie Fenton
Metro-Goldwyn-Mayer films
1930s English-language films
1930s American films